Éric Veilleux (born February 20, 1972) is a Canadian former professional ice hockey forward. Veilleux spent most of his professional career in the American Hockey League. He is an assistant coach with the Syracuse Crunch of the American Hockey League.

Coaching career
For the 2015–16 season, he was the head coach with the Norfolk Admirals of the ECHL following a season as an assistant coach with the American Hockey League's Norfolk Admirals. In May 2016, he was named the head coach and general manager of the Victoriaville Tigres of the Quebec Major Junior Hockey League before being hired to coach the Colorado Avalanche's AHL affiliate, the San Antonio Rampage, on July 6, 2016.

He coached the Rampage for two seasons, finishing out of the playoffs in both occasions, before leaving the club and Avalanche organization following the 2017–18 season.

He returned to the QMJHL as the head coach of the Halifax Mooseheads for the 2018–19 season.

After a successful season, he returned to the AHL to become an assistant coach with the Syracuse Crunch.

Career statistics

Awards and honours

References

External links

1972 births
Living people
Baie-Comeau Drakkar coaches
Canadian ice hockey centres
Canadian ice hockey coaches
Cornwall Aces players
French Quebecers
Halifax Mooseheads coaches
Hershey Bears players
Ice hockey people from Quebec City
Kentucky Thoroughblades players
Laval Titan players
Lowell Lock Monsters players
Manitoba Moose (IHL) players
Shawinigan Cataractes coaches